Botanical gardens in Brazil have collections consisting entirely of Brazil native and endemic species; most have a collection that include plants from around the world. There are botanical gardens and arboreta in all states and territories of Brazil, most are administered by local governments, some are privately owned.
 Instituto Plantarum – São Paulo
 Fundação Zoobotânica – Porto Alegre
 Fundação Zoo-Botânica de Belo Horizonte (Zoo-botanical foundation of Belo Horizonte) – Belo Horizonte
 Jardim Botânico de Curitiba – Curitiba
 Jardim Botânico de São Paulo – São Paulo
 Jardim Botânico do Rio de Janeiro – Rio de Janeiro
 Núcleo de Pesquisa e Desenvolvimento Jardim Botânico – Campinas
 Jardim Botânico de Brasilia – Brasília

References 

Brazil
Botanical gardens